Patrick Graham (born January 24, 1979) is an American football coach and former player who is the defensive coordinator for the Las Vegas Raiders of the National Football League (NFL). He previously served as defensive coordinator for the New York Giants and Miami Dolphins as well as an inside linebackers coach for the Green Bay Packers and an assistant coach for the New England Patriots.

College career
Graham played college football as a defensive lineman at Yale University, graduating with a bachelor's degree in sociology in 2002.

Coaching career

College
Following his college football career, Graham worked as a graduate assistant at Wagner College while also studying for his MBA. After two seasons at Wagner, Graham moved to the University of Richmond, where he was the defensive line coach in 2004 and then a tight ends coach in 2005 and 2006. In 2007, he was a defensive graduate assistant under head coach Charlie Weis at the University of Notre Dame. Following the 2008 season, Graham accepted the position as the team's defensive line coach at the University of Toledo. He resigned after one month.

New England Patriots
In February 2009 Graham joined the New England Patriots as a defensive coaching assistant, where Weis had formerly been an assistant coach under head coach Bill Belichick. In 2010, Graham's title was changed to defensive assistant coach. He was promoted to linebackers coach in 2011. In 2012, he moved to defensive line coach, and moved back to linebackers in 2014. He won his first Super Bowl title when the Patriots defeated the Seattle Seahawks in Super Bowl XLIX.

New York Giants
In 2016, Graham was hired by the New York Giants as the team's defensive line coach.

Green Bay Packers
In 2018, Graham was hired by the Green Bay Packers to be their run game coordinator.

Miami Dolphins
On February 8, 2019, the Miami Dolphins announced Graham as their defensive coordinator. reuniting with former Patriots coach Brian Flores.

New York Giants (second stint)
On January 17, 2020, Graham returned to the New York Giants and was hired as their assistant head coach and defensive coordinator under head coach Joe Judge whom he had worked with in the Patriots organization from 2012 to 2018.

Las Vegas Raiders
After originally being announced as being retained by Brian Daboll, on February 4, 2022, Graham was hired by the Las Vegas Raiders as defensive coordinator under new head coach Josh McDaniels. Graham previously worked alongside McDaniels on the New England Patriots from 2012 to 2015.

Personal life
Graham is married to Pamela Best, and they have two children, Morgan and Silas.

References

External links
New York Giants profile
New England Patriots bio
Toledo Rockets bio
Notre Dame Fighting Irish bio

1979 births
Living people
African-American coaches of American football
African-American players of American football
American football defensive linemen
Green Bay Packers coaches
Miami Dolphins coaches
National Football League defensive coordinators
Notre Dame Fighting Irish football coaches
New England Patriots coaches
New York Giants coaches
Las Vegas Raiders coaches
Richmond Spiders football coaches
Sportspeople from Waterbury, Connecticut
Toledo Rockets football coaches
Wagner Seahawks football coaches
Yale Bulldogs football players
21st-century African-American sportspeople
20th-century African-American sportspeople